Susanna Pöykiö (born 22 February 1982) is a Finnish former figure skater. She is a two-time European medalist (silver in 2005, bronze in 2009) and a five-time (2000, 2002, 2005–2007) Finnish national champion.

Career 

Pöykiö began skating at age three, following in the footsteps of her elder sister, Heidi.

At the 2001 World Junior Championships, Pöykiö became the first Finnish ladies' singles skater to medal at an ISU Championships.

Pöykiö withdrew from the 2003 Finnish Championships after the short program due to illness. An ankle injury kept her out of the 2004 Finnish Championships.

At the 2005 Europeans, she became the first Finn to medal in ladies' singles at the European Championships.

Pöykiö withdrew from the 2005 Skate Canada International due to bronchitis. She competed at the 2006 Olympics, placing 13th. She left her long-time coach Berit Kaijomaa at the end of the season and began training in her hometown Oulu with her sister Heidi as her coach.

Pöykiö won the bronze medal at the 2009 European Championships. Together with Laura Lepistö, it was the first time Finns claimed two spots on the European Championships podium. She had back problems during her career and retired from competition in 2010.

Programs

Competitive highlights

References

External links 

 
 Oulun Luistelukerho - Skating Club 

1982 births
Living people
Sportspeople from Oulu
Figure skaters at the 2006 Winter Olympics
Finnish female single skaters
Olympic figure skaters of Finland
European Figure Skating Championships medalists
World Junior Figure Skating Championships medalists
21st-century Finnish women